Margaret Wright may refer to:

 Margaret Wright (British politician) (1940–2012), British Green Party politician
 Margaret Wright (American politician) (born 1922/3), U.S. Presidential candidate in 1976
 Margaret Wright (actress) (1917–1999), American actress in Dumbo
 Margaret Wright (lighthouse keeper) (1854–1933), Welsh rescuer of the Mumbles lifeboat crew
 Margaret H. Wright (born 1944), American computer scientist